Judith Rothschild (1921–1993) was an American abstract painter and philanthropist. Rothschild was born in New York city and studied art at Cranbrook Academy and at the Art Students League. Her work is included in the collections of the National Gallery of Art, Washington, the Whitney Museum of American Art and the Phillips Collection.

At the time of her death, Rothschild owned a significant collection works by artists such as Piet Mondrian, Henri Matisse, Constantin Brâncuși, Juan Gris and Pablo Picasso. Rothschild specified in her will that her assets should be used to create the Judith Rothschild Foundation, in order to support the "conservation, publication, and exhibition of works by Ms. Rothschild’s contemporaries". The foundation's mandate required it to direct support only to artists who had died between 1976 and 2008.

References

1921 births
1993 deaths
Cranbrook Educational Community alumni